Tacna is a city in southern Peru and the regional capital of the Tacna Region. It is Peru's tenth most populous city.

Initially called San Pedro de Tacna, it has gained a reputation for patriotism, with many monuments and streets named after heroes of Peru's struggle for independence (1821–1824) and the War of the Pacific (1879–1883).

History
Francisco Antonio De Zela, a royal accountant (similar in function to a modern-day income tax auditor), initiated the push for Peruvian Independence from Spain in 1811 in Tacna, leading to a series of commemorative actions for the city, culminating in the 1828 declaration of Tacna as the "Heroic City" by President José de La Mar.

It was the capital of the short-lived Peru-Bolivian Confederation (1836–1839).

Tacna was known for its mining industry; it had significant deposits of sodium nitrate and other resources. Its economic prosperity attracted a wave of immigrants from Italy. Today, their Italian Peruvian descendants live in the city and many of them still have Italian surnames. This era of successful commerce and agriculture ended drastically with the start of the War of the Pacific. Hosting a large Peru-Bolivian army under poor sanitary conditions the city lost a substantial part of its population to infectious diseases before its capture by Chile in May 1880 following a defeat of the allied army in the outskirts of the city by a Chilean force under General Manuel Baquedano.

Occupation by Chile
During the war, the cities of Tacna and Arica were occupied by the Chilean Army, with Tacna being incorporated as a commune with a province of the same name. A peace agreement, the Treaty of Ancón, was signed in 1883. Under the terms of the treaty, Chile was to occupy the provinces of Tacna and Arica for ten years, taking control of the valuable mineral deposits, after which a plebiscite was to be held to determine the region's sovereignty. But when the ten years had elapsed, the two sides could not agree whether to include a large number of imported Chilean laborers in the vote. Tacna remained under Chilean control for 50 years, Chilean groups and authorities lead a campaign of Chilenization in an attempt to persuade the local population to abandon their Peruvian past and accept Chilean nationality.

However, Peruvian nationalists ensured that the Chilean propaganda failed and the planned plebiscite was never held. Finally, in 1929, the Treaty of Lima was signed in which Chile kept Arica, whilst Peru reacquired Tacna and received a $6 million indemnity and other concessions.

Some of the important persons who lived in Tacna during the Chilean administration were Salvador Allende and his family, who lived eight years in the city. Salvador had lived in Tacna since he was a baby; he arrived in 1908 and he studied in the Tacna School (Liceo de Tacna).

Today, Tacna is a mostly commercial city with many migrants from the Puno Region living there. Its economy is based on mercantile activities with the north of Chile (Arica and Iquique). Since it is part of a duty-free zone, Tacna has come to rival Arequipa as southern Peru's main business area. The city has one of the largest artifact markets in the world with imports from Japan and China, and traditional Peruvian handicrafts.

Geography
The area is generally desert, with a few fertile spots near the mountains. No rivers cross the entire province.

Climate
Tacna has a desert climate (BWk/BWh, according to the Köppen climate classification).

Transport

Rail 
Tacna was served by a cross-border  Tacna-Arica Railway to Arica, Chile. The line closed in 2012, but as of June 2014, there were plans to reopen it. 

It is also the location of the National Railway Museum of Peru.

Air
Tacna is served by the Crnl. FAP. Carlos Ciriani Santa Rosa International Airport, with flights to Arequipa and Lima.

Road
Tacna is also served by Peru Highway 1 which heads south to Arica and north to Moquegua.

Tourist attractions

Many monuments are located in this city, including the arch of the Alto de la Alianza and the Tacna Parabolic Arch.

Other monuments include a neo-renaissance Cathedral, the Courthouse, the Alameda Bolognesi Walkway and the caves of Toquepala, where archaeologists have found some of the oldest human remains in Peru.

Festivities

The most important festivity in the city is the Semana de Tacna ("Tacna Week"), which runs from August 25–30.

This tradition started in 1901, during the Chilean occupation of Tacna, by a group of tacneños who defied the prohibition of showing Peruvian flags imposed by the Chilean authorities.

There is an agrarian and industrial fair as part of these celebrations.

In September, the festival of the Señor de Locumba is celebrated, which draws thousands of faithful people from all over the world.

Gallery

See also
 2001 southern Peru earthquake
 Tacna Departament
 Tacna Province
 Tacna District
 Tarata
 Tacna during Chilean administration (1883–1929)
 Diocese of Tacna y Moquegua

References

External links 

  
 

Populated places in the Tacna Region
Populated places established in 1572
Capitals of former nations
Chile–Peru border crossings
Cities in Peru
1572 establishments in the Spanish Empire
Regional capital cities in Peru